Nationality words link to articles with information on the nation's poetry or literature (for instance, Irish or France).

Events
 January 25 – Dylan Thomas's Under Milk Wood is broadcast posthumously on BBC Radio.
 February – W. H. Auden and Chester Kallman move to an apartment on the Lower East Side of Manhattan.
 Spring – Robert Creeley founds and edits the Black Mountain Review.
 Publication of American literary theorist William K. Wimsatt's collected essays Verbal Icon: Studies in the Meaning of Poetry, including the influential critical essays “The Intentional Fallacy” and “The Affective Fallacy” cowritten with Monroe Beardsley.
 Jack Kerouac reads Dwight Goddard's A Buddhist Bible, which will influence him greatly.

Works published in English
Listed by nation where the work was first published and again by the poet's native land, if different; substantially revised works listed separately:

Canada
 Daryl Hine, Five Poems
 Irving Layton, In the Midst of My Fever. Palma de Mallorca, Spain: Divers Press.
 Irving Layton, The Long Pea-Shooter. Montreal: Laocoon Press.
 Jay Macpherson, O Earth Return
 P. K. Page, The Metal and the Flower, Toronto: McClelland & Stewart, Canada
 Raymond Souster, A Dream That Is Dying. Toronto: Contact Press
 Raymond Souster, Walking Death. Toronto: Contact Press.
 F. R. Scott, Events and Signals. Toronto: Ryerson Press.
 A. J. M. Smith, A Sort of Ecstasy; Michigan State College Press / Ryerson Press.

India, in English
 Sri Aurobindo:
 Collected Poems (Poetry in English), Pondicherry: Sri Aurobindo Ashram
 Savitri ( Poetry in English ), Pondicherry: Sri Aurobindo Ashram
 R. de L. Furtado, The Centre, Hamilton, Ontario: Cromlech Press; Indian author published in Canada
 Nizamat Jung, Poems (Poetry in English), edited and published by Zahir Ahmed in Hyderabad
 Prithwi Singh Nahar, The Wind of Silence (Poetry in English), songs, sonnets and other poems; Pondicherry: Sri Aurobindo Ashram
 C. Raju, This Modern Age, foreword by Amarnath Jha
 K. S. R. Sastry, A Vision of India, Madras: Raja Power Press

United Kingdom
 W. H. Auden, The Shield of Achilles, English poet living in the United States at this time
 Sir John Betjeman, A Few Late Chrysanthemums
 George Mackay Brown, The Storm, Scotland
 Thom Gunn, Fighting Terms, Fantasy Press
 John Heath-Stubbs, A Charm Against the Toothace
 Philip Larkin, The Less Deceived
 David Raikes (posthumous), The Poems of David Raikes

Criticism, scholarship and biography in the United Kingdom
 P. Cruttwell, The Shakespearean Moment, criticism, United Kingdom
 G. Hartmann, The Unmediated Vision, criticism, United Kingdom
 W. K. Wimsatt Jr., The Verbal Icon, criticism, United Kingdom
 Jon Silkin, The Peaceable Kingdom, including "Death of a Son (who died in a mental hospital aged one)"
 Dylan Thomas, Quite Early One Morning, New Directions Publishers

United States
 Léonie Adams, Poems
 W. H. Auden, The Shield of Achilles, English poet living in the United States at this time
 Louise Bogan, Collected Poems, 1923–1953
 E. E. Cummings, Poems, 1923–1954
 Babette Deutsch, Animal, Vegetable, Mineral
 Anthony Hecht, A Summoning of Stones
 Daniel G. Hoffman, An Armada of Thirty Wales
 Robinson Jeffers, Hungerfield and Other Poems
 Weldon Kees, Poems 1947–1954
 Archibald MacLeish, Songs for Eve
 W. S. Merwin, The Dancing Bears, New Haven, Connecticut: Yale University Press (reprinted as part of The First Four Books of Poems, 1975)
 Edna St. Vincent Millay, Mine the Harvest
 Marianne Moore, The Fables of La Fontaine
 Howard Moss, The Toy Fair
 Kenneth Patchen, The Famous Boating Party
 May Swenson, Another Animal
 Wallace Stevens, The Collected Poems of Wallace Stevens, includes "The Rock," previously unpublished section including "The Poem That Took the Place of a Mountain," "A Quiet Normal Life," "Final Soliloquy of the Interior Paramour," "The Rock," "The Planet on the Table," and "Not Ideas about the Thing but the Thing Itself"), Knopf
 E. B. White, The Second Tree from the Corner
 William Carlos Williams, The Desert Music and Other Poems

Criticism, scholarship and biography in the United States
 Hugh Kenner, Wyndham Lewis: A Critical Guidebook, criticism, United States
 W. C. Williams, Selected Essays, criticism, United States

Other
 Martin Carter, Poems of Resistance, Guyana
 Wilson Harris, Eternity to Season, Guyana
 Frank Prince, Soldiers Bathing and Other Poems, South African
 Keith Sinclair, Strangers or Beasts: Poems, New Zealand

Works published in other languages

French language

Canada, in French
 Jean-Guy Pilon, Les cloîtres de l'été, Montréal: l'Hexagone

France
 Louis Aragon, Les Yeux et la memoire
 Jean Cocteau, Clair–obscur
 René Daumal, Poésie noire, poésie blanche, posthumously published (died 1944)
 Jean Follain, Appareil de la terre
 Jean Grosjean, Fils de l'homme
 Henri Michaux, Face au verrous

India
In each section, listed in alphabetical order by first name:

Hindi
 Girija Kumar Mathur, Dhup ke dhan
 Namvar Singh, Chayavad, literary criticism that offers a radically new interpretation of the romantic movement in Hindi poetry; shows the social foundations of Hindi romanticism and its ties to the progressive movement that followed it
 Premchand, Sahitya Ka Uddesya, literary essays; published posthumously

Malayalam
 P. K. Paramesvaran Nair, Adhunika Sahitya Caritram, history of Malayalam literature (later translated into English and published by Sahitya Akademi in 1967 under the title History of Malayalam Literature)
 P. Kunjiraman Nair, Kaliyacchan, poems reflecting traditional ways of life in Kerala
 Sreedhara Menon, Kunnimenikal
 Sukumar Azhikode, Asante Sitakavyam, critical assessment of Kumaran Asan's Cintavishtayaya

Urdu

 Gian Chand Jain, literary criticism on classical Urdu fiction ("dastan"), written in that language
 Jigar Brelvi, Payam-i Savitri, a narrative poem on Savitri, a figure from Hindu mythology; Urdu
 Masood Husain Khan, Urdu zaban aur adab, critical study on the Urdu language and literature

Other languages of the Indian subcontinent
 Baldev Gajra, also known as "Gumnam", Gumnam Sada, nationalist poems; Sindhi
 Buddhadeb Basu, Sahitya Carca, essays on various literary topics; Bengali
 Jayant Pathak, Marmar, the author's first poetry collection; Gujarati
 M. Gopalakrishna Adiga, Cendemaddale, Kannada
 Mohan Singh, Awazan, lyrics with a "romantic progressive ideology", according to Indian academic Sisir Kumar Das; Punjabi
 Nand Lal Ambardar, Loel Ta Husun, including "Roopavat", Kashmiri
 Nirendranath Chakraborty (also transliterated into English as Nirendranath Chakravarti), Nilnirjan (also transliterated into English as Nirendranath Chakravarti), mostly love poems, although one or two have political elements, Kolkata: Signet Press; Bengali-language
 Raghunath Singh Samyal, Dogra Desa Te Dogari Boli, Dogri poetry praising Dograland, Dogra people and the Dogri language
 Tulasibahadur Chetri, nicknamed "Apatan", Samkalpa ("Resolve"), Nepali
 Madhunapantula Satyanarayanashastri, also spelled "Madhunapantula Satyanarayana Sastri", Andhra Puranamu, Telugu, (surname: Madhunapantula)
 Manoj Das, Padadvani, Oriya
 Satramdas, also known as "Sail", Rama Katha, 32 cantos in a Persian meter, written in the wake of the partition of India in 1947; Sindhi
 Visvanatha Satyanarayana, Nannayagari prasanna Katha Kalitartha Yukti, critical appraisal of Nannaya; Telugu

Other languages
 Simin Behbahani, Ja-ye Pa ("Footprint"), Persia
 José Santos Chocano, Obras completas, . de Luis Alberto Sánchez Madrid, Aguilar, Peruvian poetry published in Spain
 Haim Gouri, Shirei Hotam ("Poems of the Seal"), Israeli writing in Hebrew
 Sorley MacLean, Hallaig, Scottish Gaelic (in Gairm 8)
 Pier Paolo Pasolini, La meglio gioventù, Italy (dialect)
 Maria Luisa Spaziani, Le acque del sabato, Italy
 Wisława Szymborska,  ("Questioning Yourself"), Poland
 Tin Ujević, Žedan kamen na studencu ("Thirsty stone at the wellspring"), Croatian

Awards and honors
 National Book Award for Poetry: Conrad Aiken, Collected Poems
 Pulitzer Prize for Poetry: Theodore Roethke: The Waking
 King's Gold Medal for Poetry: Ralph Hodgson
 Bollingen Prize: W. H. Auden
 Fellowship of the Academy of American Poets: Louise Townsend Nicholl and Oliver St. John Gogarty
 Canada: Governor General's Award, poetry or drama: The Metal and the Flower, P. K. Page

Births
Death years link to the corresponding "[year] in poetry" article:
 February 9 – Ian Duhig, English poet
 February 13 – Vijay Seshadri, Indian poet, essayist and literary critic who emigrates to the United States c. 1959
 February 21 – Francisco X. Alarcón (died 2016), Mexican-American poet
 February 27 – Thylias Moss, African-American poet, writer and playwright
 March 4 – Irina Ratushinskaya, Russian samizdat poet
 March 26 – Dorothy Porter (died 2008), Australian
 April 17 – Erín Moure, Canadian
 May 5 – Hamid Ismailov, Uzbek writer
 May 25 – Alexei Parshchikov (died 2009), Russian poet, critic and translator who emigrates to the United States in 1991
 July 5 – Kevin Hart, Australian
 July 19 – Jane Eaton Hamilton, Canadian short story writer, poet and photographer
 July 31 – Kim Addonizio, American poet and novelist
 August 6 – Lorna Dee Cervantes, American poet
 August 8 – Yu Jian, China
 August 15 – Mary Jo Salter, American
 October 15 – Peter Bakowski, Australian
 November 10 – Joy Goswami, Indian Bengali poet (a man)
 December 5 – Lynda Hull, American
 December 20 – Sandra Cisneros, American poet and author
 December 27 – David Baker, American
 Also:
 Catherine Anderson (poet), American
 Robert Boates, Canadian
 Brother Resistance, Trinidadian (died 2021)
 Janet Charman, New Zealand
 Imtiaz Dharker, Pakistan-born British
 Cornelius Eady, African American
 David Hallett, Australian
 Sotiris Kakisis, Greek
 Jan Heller Levi, American
 Ahmed Matar, Iraqi poet
 Ibrahim Nasrallah, Jordanian-Palestinian poet and novelist
 Luis J. Rodriguez, American poet, novelist, journalist, critic and columnist
 Stephen Sartarelli, poet and translator
 Deb Westbury (died 2018), Australian

Deaths
Birth years link to the corresponding "[year] in poetry" article:
 January 1 – Leonard Bacon, 66 (born 1887), American poet
 February 6 – Maxwell Bodenheim, 62 (born 1892), American poet and novelist known as the "King of Greenwich Village Bohemians", murdered
 March 28 – Francis Brett Young, 73 (born 1884), English novelist and poet
 August 3 – Fumiko Nakajo 中城ふみ子, pen name of Noe Fumiko 野江富美子, 32 (born 1922), Japanese tanka poet who dies young after a turbulent life and struggle with breast cancer, as recorded in her poetry (surname: Nakajo)
 August 18 – Samukawa Sokotsu 寒川鼠骨 (born 1875), Japanese, Meiji period haiku poet; Masaoka Shiki's pupil.
 October 22
 Jibanananda Das (born 1899), Bengali poet
 Oswald de Andrade (born 1890), Brazilian poet and polemicist

See also

 Poetry
 List of poetry awards
 List of years in poetry

Notes

20th-century poetry
Poetry